Sami Abdulrahman Park is a park in Erbil, Kurdistan Region in Iraq.

History
The site was formerly the location of Saddam Hussein's 5th Corps Army military base. Construction of the park began in 1998, and it was completed the same year.

It is named after Sami Abdulrahman, the Deputy Prime Minister of the Kurdistan Regional Government who was killed in a suicide bombing on 1 February 2004, aged 71.

Features
The park is 200 hectares (2.0 km2) in size and contains two lakes, a rose garden and the Martyrs Monument as well as a restaurant and market. It includes a monument with the inscription, "Freedom is not free."

The finish line of the annual Erbil Marathon is in the park.

References

Erbil
Parks in Iraq
2006 establishments in Iraq
Buildings and structures completed in 2006
Tourist attractions in Iraqi Kurdistan